Pomeriggio Cinque is an Italian television entertainment news program broadcast every weekday at 5:00 p.m., on the Italian TV channel Canale 5. Barbara D'Urso has hosted the program since 2008. The program leads the ratings for its time slot (share 20% / 2  mln).

Cast
 Éva Henger
 Riccardo Signoretti
 Roberto Alessi
 Daniele Interrante
 Patrizia Groppelli
 Paola Caruso
 Biagio D'Anelli

References

Mediaset
Infotainment
Italian television talk shows
2008 Italian television series debuts
2000s Italian television series
2010s Italian television series
Canale 5 original programming